Spellbinders is a comic book published by Marvel Comics, as part of that company's Marvel Next imprint. It was a six-issue limited series written by Mike Carey with art by Mike Perkins. It is part of the Marvel Universe, but the story takes no advantage of the fact.

Spellbinders is set around John Hathorne High School, a fictional high school in Salem, Massachusetts, where magic is accepted as a fact. There are rivalries between magical students ('wicks') and non-magical students ('blanks'), and between the various covens.

The story centers around Kim Vesco, a girl from Chicago who has strange dreams and an interest in sculpture.

Plot synopsis

Issue one
In the first issue Kim and her family move to Salem. On her first day she meets Chad Barrow, her neighbor, who tells her she'll be fine in school, provided she isn't a nerd or a 'wick'. Her first day at school is rough, she is attacked by an air elemental, but is saved by two wicks, Mink and Liza Beth. Later at home, she is attacked by a wall.

Issue two
After the wall attacks her Kim discovers that she can talk to ghosts when she 'spirit walks' and accidentally summons a horde of ghosts. One of the ghosts tells her that she has to wield the Salem covens into a single unit, a 'seven'. Another ghost warns her 'not to go to the pillar'.

At a science class, the bunsen burners explode and the lab catches fire. Kim saves herself by making a mora poultice which smothers the fire.

Chad asks her to go to a party. When he asks her about her parents, she mentions that she is adopted. The Salem witches reason that if Kim is adopted, she may be one of them. On the night of the party, they secretly guard her against all forms of magical attack.

Issue three
At the party, the lights go out and someone attacks Kim with a knife. Realising they have not protected Kim against physical attack, the Salem witches rush to the party just in time to see Kim running from a wolf-monster. Renata, a shapeshifter, changes into another wolf creature, and the two fight. But when the thing sees the rest of the witches arriving, it turns into a flock of birds and flies away.

The Salem witches drag Kim away from the party before the police arrive, and explain the secret history of the witch families of Salem. The witch families are descended from refugees from 'somewhere else'. They came to Salem fleeing the Thief, an occult being and they brought an artifact called the Pillar of Smoke with them. Certain families can work certain kinds of magic. When they offer to take her to the Pillar, Kim declines on the grounds that the ghost told her not to. She goes home, to discover that something trashed her sculpture tools. The final page reveals Chad as the one from the party who tried to kill Kim.

Issue four
Kim finally agrees to go to the Pillar of Smoke and the witches take her to the woods near Salem. There, they lay a magical booby trap, and continue on their way. They meet Apocaledon, the guardian of the pillar. Along the way, Kim realises that witches have been dying in unusual circumstances, where their powers backfired and killed them. Behind them, Chad undoes the booby trap with little or no effort. The group gets to the Pillar, and discovers that Kim is a witch (as she can see the smoke it gives off), but have no idea what her powers are. Suddenly, the wrecked body of Apocaledon falls into the clearing followed by Chad who reveals that he is a new version of the Thief, a witch who can copy the powers of other Salem witches. He explains that mutations within the humans of Salem built up over years of interbreeding with the witches eventually culminated in a new Thief. He then easily defeats the group and destroys the Pillar.

Issue five
When the group wakes up, they find themselves in a washed-out world, where their magics won't work fully. They realise that this must be the 'somewhere else' the Salem witches came from.

Kim and Foley, a seer, make contact with a ghost, who tells them to apologise to the Pillar. Kim does so and touches the Pillar. Magical energy shoots out of the remains of the Pillar and Kim and Foley find themselves in a white space where a line of corpses are guarded by flying skeletons.

Meanwhile, the rest of the group encounters the original Thief but escape by pooling their powers and teleporting back to Salem. There Chad has been busy. He has stolen the powers of every witch in town and is now using their powers to bring his girlfriend (the first witch he killed and the ghost who was helping Kim) back to life.

Issue six
In the land of the dead Kim and Foley are confronted by the flying skeletons. They tell Kim that she is the Gatekeeper, chosen by the Pillar to guard the way between the lands of the living and dead and mend breaches made by magic. The skeletons attempt to keep Foley with them but Kim convinces them to allow him to leave with her.

Back in Salem, Chad has resurrected his girlfriend and has Kim's friends trapped within one of their own spells. They break free just as Kim and Foley arrive. The whole group then has their final confrontation with Chad. Using her necromancy powers, Kim first frees Chad's girlfriend from a state of paralysis and then lets her die again (the girlfriend hates Chad and does not wish to be with him anymore). Because she is bound to him, Chad dies as well. In the afterlife, Chad is punished by the skeletons for raising the dead and the girlfriend is taken to the next life.

The group of witches leave the school. Before she leaves, Kim notices a small lizard (the leftover of one of the first witch casualties, a wick boy who died the night Kim was summoned to Salem). She tells it to hold on, as things are starting to work out.

References
Magic Mikey: Mike Carey talks "Spellbinders", Comic Book Resources, May 23, 2005
Spellbinders at the Big Comic Book DataBase

2005 comics debuts
Marvel Next
Marvel Comics limited series
Comics by Mike Carey (writer)